The Great Deceiver may refer to:

 Satan, an embodiment of antagonism in Abrahamic beliefs
 The Great Deceiver (band), a Swedish hardcore/metal band
 The Great Deceiver (King Crimson album), a 1992 box set
 The Great Deceiver (Mortiis album) a forthcoming album by Mortiis
 The Great Deceiver (1953 film), a Mexican film
 "The Great Deceiver", a song by Evergrey from Recreation Day
 "The Great Deceiver", a song by In Flames from Foregone
 "The Great Deceiver", a song by King Crimson from Starless and Bible Black

See also
 Deceiver (disambiguation), includes uses of The Deceiver